A list of USAAF, USN, USCG, and USMC aircraft from World War II.

United States Coast Guard 

 Consolidated PBY-5 Catalina - Amphibian flying boat
 Curtiss SOC-4 Seagull - Floatplane
 Douglas RD-4 Dolphin -  Flying boat
 Fairchild J2K - Liaison
 Grumman JF-2 Duck - Amphibian floatplane
 Grumman J2F-4 Duck - Amphibian floatplane
 Grumman JRF Goose - Amphibian flying boat
 Grumman J4F Widgeon - Amphibian flying boat
 Hall PH - Flying boat
 R5O-1 - Executive transport
 Naval Aircraft Factory N3N-3 - Trainer
 Vultee SNV - Trainer

United States Navy

 Aeronca LNR - Observation/liaison/trainer
 Beechcraft SNB Navigator - Trainer
 Beechcraft JRB - Transport
 Beechcraft GB Traveler - Transport
 Bell XTDL Airacobra - Fighter
 Bell XF2L Airacomet - Jet fighter
 Boeing PB Flying Fortress - Heavy bomber
 Boeing P2B Superfortress - Heavy bomber
 Boeing 314 Clipper - Impressed flying boat transport
 Boeing XF8B - Prototype carrier-based fighter-bomber
 Boeing XPBB Sea Ranger - Flying boat/patrol bomber
 Brewster F2A Buffalo - Carrier-based fighter
 Brewster SBA/Naval Aircraft Factory SBN - Carrier-based scout bomber/trainer
 Brewster SB2A Buccaneer - Carrier-based scout bomber
 Budd RB-1 Conestoga - Transport
 Cessna JRC - Transport
 Consolidated PB4Y-1 Liberator - Patrol bomber
 Consolidated PB4Y-2 Privateer - Patrol bomber
 Consolidated PBY/PBN Catalina - Seaplane patrol bomber
 Consolidated PB2Y Coronado - Flying boat/patrol bomber
 Consolidated XP4Y Corregidor - Flying boat/patrol bomber
 Culver TDC - Radio-controlled drone
 Culver TD2C - Radio-controlled drone
 Curtiss F11C Goshawk - Biplane fighter
 Curtiss R5C Commando - Transport
 Curtiss XF14C - Prototype carrier-based fighter
 Curtiss SBC Helldiver - Carrier-based scout bomber
 Curtiss SB2C Helldiver - Carrier-based dive bomber
 Curtiss SOC Seagull - Observation aircraft
 Curtiss SO3C Seamew - Observation aircraft
 Curtiss SC Seahawk - ASW aircraft
 Curtiss SNC Falcon - Trainer
 Douglas BD Havoc - Attack bomber
 Douglas BTD Destroyer - Carrier-based torpedo bomber
 Douglas A-26 Invader - Attack bomber
 Douglas RD Dolphin - Amphibian flying boat transport
 Douglas R2D - Transport
 Douglas R3D - Transport
 Douglas R4D - Transport
 Douglas R5D - Transport
 Douglas SBD Dauntless - Carrier-based dive bomber
 Douglas TBD Devastator - Carrier-based torpedo bomber
 Fairchild JK - Liaison
 Fairchild J2K/GK - Liaison/trainer
 Goodyear FG Corsair - Carrier-based fighter/bomber
 General Motors FM Wildcat - Carrier-based fighter
 Great Lakes BG - Target drone (withdrawn as carrier bomber)
 Grumman F3F - Carrier-based fighter
 Grumman F4F Wildcat - Carrier-based fighter
 Grumman XF5F Skyrocket - Carrier-based prototype fighter
 Grumman F6F Hellcat - Carrier-based fighter
 Grumman F7F Tigercat - Carrier-based fighter
 Grumman F8F Bearcat - Carrier-based fighter
 Grumman JRF Goose - Flying boat
 Grumman J4F Widgeon - Flying boat
 Grumman JF Duck - Amphibian shipboard spotter
 Grumman J2F Duck - Amphibian shipboard spotter
 Grumman TBF/TBM Avenger - Carrier-based torpedo-bomber
 Howard GH/NH Nightingale - Liaison/ambulance aircraft
 Interstate TDR - Assault drone
 Lockheed JO - Transport/gunnery trainer
 Lockheed R2O Electra - Transport
 Lockheed R5O Lodestar - Transport
 Lockheed PBO - Patrol bomber
 Lockheed PV-1 Ventura - Patrol bomber
 Lockheed PV-2 Harpoon - Patrol bomber
 Lockheed FO-1 - Fighter
 Martin JM Marauder - Medium bomber
 Martin JRM Mars - Transport flying boat
 Martin M-130 - Impressed flying boat
 Martin PBM Mariner - Flying boat
 Martin PB2M Mars - Prototype patrol flying boat
 Naval Aircraft Factory N3N - Trainer
 Naval Aircraft Factory TDN - Assault drone
 North American NJ-1 - Trainer
 North American PBJ Mitchell - Medium/anti-ship bomber
 North American SNJ - Trainer
 North American ETF-51D - Fighter
 Northrop BT-1 - Dive bomber (withdrawn 1944)
 Piper LNP - Training glider
 Piper NE - Observation/liaison aircraft
 Pratt-Read LNE - Training glider
 Ryan FR Fireball - Carrier-based mixed-propulsion fighter
 Ryan NR Recruit - Trainer
 Schweizer LNS - Training glider
 Sikorsky HNS - Helicopter
 Sikorsky HO2S - Helicopter
 Sikorsky HO3S - Helicopter
 Sikorsky JRS - Transport amphibian
 Sikorsky JR2S - Impressed transport flying boat
 Sikorsky XPBS-1 - Patrol flying boat
 Stearman N2S - Trainer
 Stinson OY Sentinel - Observation/liaison aircraft
 Stinson R3Q - Trainer/utility aircraft
 Spartan NP - Trainer
 Taylorcraft LNT - Observation/liaison aircraft
 Timm N2T Tutor - Trainer
 Vought F4U Corsair - Carrier-based fighter
 Vought O3U Corsair - Scout
 Vought OS2U Kingfisher - Observation aircraft
 Vought SBU - Carrier-based dive bomber (withdrawn 1943)
 Vought SB2U Vindicator - Carrier-based dive bomber
 Vought TBU Sea Wolf/Consolidated TBY Sea Wolf - Carrier-based torpedo-bomber
 Vought V-173 - Experimental aircraft
 Vultee SNV - Trainer
 Waco LRW - Troop glider 
 Waco YKS-7 - Transport/liaison

United States Marine Corps

 Allied Aviation XLRA - Transport flying-boat glider
 Brewster F2A Buffalo - Fighter
 Consolidated PBY Catalina - Patrol bomber
 Consolidated PB4Y-2 Privateer - Patrol bomber 
 Curtiss R5C Commando - Transport
 Curtiss SBC Helldiver - Dive bomber
 Curtiss SB2C Helldiver - Dive bomber
 Douglas BD Havoc - Attack/medium bomber/target tug
 Douglas RD Dolphin - Amphibian transport
 Douglas R3D - Transport
 Douglas R4D Skytrain - Transport
 Douglas R5D Skymaster - Transport
 Douglas SBD Dauntless - Dive bomber
 Grumman F4F Wildcat - Fighter
 Grumman F6F Hellcat - Fighter/night fighter
 Grumman JRF Goose - Amphibian transport
 Grumman TBF Avenger - Torpedo bomber
 Lockheed JO-2 - Transport
 Lockheed R5O Lodestar - Transport
 Lockheed PV-1 Ventura - Ppatrol bomber
 Martin JM Marauder - Attack/medium bomber/target tug
 North American PBJ Mitchell - Attack/medium bomber
 North American SNJ - Trainer
 Northrop F2T Black Widow - Night fighter
 Pratt-Read LNE - Training glider
 Schweizer LNS - Training glider
 Stinson OY Sentinel - Observation/liaison aircraft
 Vought F4U Corsair - Fighter bomber/night fighter
 Vought SB2U Vindicator - Dive bomber

United States Army Air Forces/Corps

 Aeronca L-3 - Observation/liaison aircraft
 Airspeed Oxford - Trainer
 Avro AT-20 Anson - Trainer
 Beechcraft XA-38 Grizzly - Prototype attack bomber
 Beechcraft C-45 Expeditor - Transport/trainer
 Beechcraft AT-10 Wichita - Advanced trainer
 Bell YFM-1 Airacuda - Interceptor
 Bell P-39 Airacobra - Fighter
 Bell P-59 Airacomet - Jet fighter
 Bell P-63 Kingcobra - Fighter
 Bell XP-77 - Prototype lightweight fighter
 Boeing P-26 Peashooter - Fighter
 Boeing XB-15/XC-105 - Long-range bomber/transport
 Boeing B-17 Flying Fortress - Heavy bomber
 Boeing B-29 Superfortress - Heavy bomber
 Boeing-Stearman PT-17 Kaydet - Primary trainer
 Boulton Paul Defiant - Trainer/target tug
 Brewster 339C/D Buffalo - ex-Dutch KNIL-ML fighter
 Bristol Beaufighter - Fighter
 Budd C-93 Conestoga - Transport
 Cessna AT-8/AT-17/UC-78 - Advanced trainer/light transport
 Consolidated B-24 Liberator - Heavy bomber
 Consolidated B-32 Dominator - Heavy bomber
 Consolidated OA-10 Catalina - Army PBY flying boat/patrol bomber
 Consolidated Vultee XP-81 - Fighter
 Vultee XA-41 - Prototype ground attack aircraft
 Culver PQ-8/A-8 - Radio-controlled target aircraft
 Culver PQ-14 Cadet - Radio-controlled target aircraft
 Curtiss A-12 Shrike - Attack bomber
 Curtiss XA-14/Curtiss A-18 Shrike - Attack bomber
 Curtiss-Wright AT-9 Jeep - Advanced twin-engine pilot trainer
 Curtiss-Wright C-46 Commando - Transport
 Curtiss-Wright C-76 Caravan - Transport
 Curtiss O-52 Owl - Observation aircraft
 Curtiss P-36 Hawk - Fighter
 Curtiss XP-37 - Prototype fighter
 Curtiss P-40 Warhawk/Kittyhawk/Tomahawk - Fighter
 Curtiss XP-46 - Prototype fighter
 Curtiss-Wright XP-55 Ascender - Prototype fighter
 Curtiss YP-60 - Fighter
 Curtiss XP-62 - Prototype fighter
 Curtiss A-25 Shrike Army SB2C - Dive bomber
 de Havilland F-8 Mosquito - Reconnaissance aircraft
 Douglas A-20 Havoc - Attack bomber
 Douglas A-26 Invader - Attack bomber
 Douglas XA/XB-42 Mixmaster - Prototype bomber
 Douglas B-18 Bolo - ASW/medium bomber
 Douglas XBLR-2/XB-19 - Prototype heavy bomber
 Douglas B-23 Dragon - Medium bomber
 Douglas C-32 - Transport
 Douglas C-47 Skytrain - Transport
 Douglas C-54 Skymaster - Transport
 Douglas C-110 - ex-Dutch Douglas DC-5 transport
 Douglas O-31 - Observation aircraft
 Douglas O-43 - Observation aircraft
 Douglas O-46 - Observation aircraft
 Douglas A-24 Dauntless - Army SBD dive bomber
 Grumman OA-9 Goose - Army JRF flying boat
 Grumman OA-14 Widgeon - Army J4F patrol aircraft
 Fairchild UC-61/86 Argus - Liaison aircraft/trainer
 Fairchild AT-21 Gunner - Advanced/gunnery trainer
 Fairchild PT-19/23/23 - Primary trainer
 Federal AT-20 - Ansons purchased for Lend-Lease as bomber trainer
 Fisher XP-75 Eagle - Prototype fighter
 Fleetwings BT-12 - Basic trainer
 Howard UC-70 Nightingale - Liaison aircraft
 Interstate L-6 Grasshopper - Observation/liaison aircraft
 Lockheed UC-101 Vega - Executive transport
 Lockheed UC-85 Orion - Executive transport 
 Lockheed C-36/Model 10 Electra - Transport
 Lockheed C-40/Model 12 Electra Junior - Transport/gunnery trainer
 Lockheed C-56/C-57/C-59/C-60/C-66/C-104 Lodestar - Transport
 Lockheed A-29 Hudson - Patrol bomber
 Lockheed C-69 Constellation - Transport
 Lockheed B-34/B-37 Lexington - Medium bomber
 Lockheed P-38 Lightning - Fighter
 Lockheed P-80 Shooting Star - Jet fighter
 Martin A-30 Baltimore - Lend-lease attack bomber
 Martin B-10/Martin B-12 - Medium bombers
 Martin B-26 Marauder - Medium bomber
 McDonnell XP-67 - Prototype fighter
 Noorduyn C-64 Norseman - Transport
 North American A-36 Invader/Apache - Dive bomber/attack aircraft
 North American B-25 Mitchell - Medium bomber
 North American XB-28 - Prototype medium bomber
 North American BT-9 - Basic trainer
 North American BT-14 - Basic trainer
 North American BC-1 - Basic combat trainer
 North American AT-6 Texan - Advanced trainer
 North American O-47 - Observation aircraft
 North American P-51 Mustang - Fighter
 North American P-64 - Fighter/advanced trainer
 North American F-82 Twin Mustang - Fighter
 Northrop A-13/A-16/A-17/A-33 - Attack aircraft
 Northrop XP-56 Black Bullet - Prototype fighter
 Northrop P-61 Black Widow - Night fighter
 Northrop XP-79 - Prototype interceptor
 Piper L-4 Grasshopper - Observation/liaison aircraft
 Republic P-43 Lancer - Fighter
 Republic P-47 Thunderbolt - Fighter
 Republic XP-72 - Prototype fighter
 Ryan PT-16/PT-22 Recruit - Primary trainer
 St. Louis YPT-15 - Primary trainer
 Seversky AT-12 Guardsman - Advanced trainer
 Seversky BT-8 - Basic trainer
 Seversky P-35 - Fighter
 Sikorsky R-4 & R-6 - Hoverfly helicopters
 Sikorsky R-5 - Helicopter
 Stinson UC-81/AT-19 Reliant - Trainer
 Stinson O-49/L-1 Vigilant - Observation/liaison aircraft
 Stinson O-62/L-5 Sentinel - Liaison aircraft
 Supermarine Spitfire - Fighter/reconnaissance
 Taylorcraft O-57/L-2 Grasshopper - Observation/liaison aircraft
 Vultee A-31/A-35 Vengeance - Dive bomber
 Vultee BT-13/BT-15 Valiant - Basic trainer
 Vultee XP-54 - Prototype fighter
 Vultee P-66 Vanguard - Fighter
 Waco CG-3 - Troop glider
 Waco CG-4 - Troop glider
 Waco PT-14 - Primary trainer
 Westland Lysander - Pater

Captured
 
Mitsubishi A6M Zero  - Test aircraft for weak spots
Mitsubishi J2M - Tested for its max speeds
Nakajima Ki-43
Nakajima Ki-44
Kawasaki Ki-45
Kawasaki Ki-61
Focke-Wulf Fw 190
Messerschmitt Bf 109

See also

 List of aircraft of World War II
 Military aircraft of the United States

References

World War II Aircraft
Aircraft
United States